Michael Richardson (born October 13, 1969) is a former Canadian football player. He attended Louisiana Tech in 1987 until 1991. In 1990, he was named Most Valuable Player in the Independence Bowl. A year later, he was signed as a free agent with the New York Giants. In 1992, he was signed by the Winnipeg Blue Bombers and quickly became a star in the Canadian Football League. Michael Richardson was an exceptional running back who played five seasons with the CFL for two different teams. In 1992, his first year with the Winnipeg Blue Bombers he rushed for 1,100 yards in only 11 games, and had one of the best playoff performances in history with 27 carries for 227 yards and two touchdowns. He was named Rookie of the Year that season. Michael Richardson also was named CFL Player of the week five times in 1992 and was a huge contributor to helping his team get to the Grey Cup that year.

In 1993, Michael Richardson won his second consecutive rushing title in the CFL. He was named CFL player of the week three times that year. He also helped his team go to the Grey Cup for the second year in a row.

In 1994 Michael Richardson signed as a free agent with the Ottawa Rough Riders and started the season off leading the CFL in rushing yards before suffering a severe torn quadriceps which sidelined him for 8 games that season. However, after healing from his injury Michael Richardson came back to finish the season. He stayed with the Ottawa Rough Riders the following year but in 1996 returned to the Winnipeg Blue Bombers.

Unlike many other Americans who come to Canada to play in the CFL, Michael Richardson fell in love with Winnipeg and decided to remain. He is married, has children and still remains involved in football in Winnipeg.

References

1969 births
Living people
American football running backs
Canadian football running backs
Louisiana Tech Bulldogs football players
Ottawa Rough Riders players
Sportspeople from Natchez, Mississippi
Players of American football from Mississippi
Winnipeg Blue Bombers players
Canadian Football League Rookie of the Year Award winners